Edappally Junction is an intersection at Edappally, Kochi  in the state of Kerala, India.
Four major highways intersect at the junction. Indian National Highway 47, National Highway 66, National Highway 47A
and Kochi Bypass intersect here. It is one of the busiest junctions in Kerala.

Roads that intersect

National Highway 66 

National Highway 66 passes through the Edappally Junction and ends in Panvel near Mumbai in Maharashtra.
It is the 7th longest highway in India with 1,296 km.

National Highway 47 

National Highway 47 passes through the  Edappally Junction. It is located at the west side of the junction.

Kochi Bypass 

The Kochi Bypass starts at the Edappally Junction and ends at Aroor Junction.
This 17-km stretch of road running across the city has evolved into a central business district of the city.

Places of interest

Lulu Cochin Mall

Lulu Cochin Mall is a shopping mall located on bypass junction. It is built on an area of 2,200,000 square feet (204,000 m2), with total area for mall alone at 1,698,000 square feet (157,700 m2) making it the biggest shopping mall of India.

See also 
 Edappally
 Lulu Cochin Mall
 Kochi

Transport in Kochi
Road junctions in India